Sockalingam Yogalingam (born 1967 in Sri Lanka) is a politician, who is a member of the "Transnational Government of Tamil Eelam" in the United Kingdom. Yogalingam held the position of deputy minister of sports and community health. He contested the seat of Ruislip, Northwood and Pinner in the 2015 United Kingdom general election, representing the far right National Liberal Party. He is the assistant director of the human rights group Act Now.

He studied his advanced level at Jaffna Central College before leaving Sri Lanka in 1985.  He also completed an HND in computers in 1998–2000. Yogalingham has six siblings and is married with two daughters.

References

External links
Sockalingam Yogalingam personal website

1965 births
Alumni of Jaffna Central College
British people of Sri Lankan Tamil descent
Living people
British political candidates
British human rights activists
Sri Lankan Tamil politicians